Saitama 3rd district (埼玉県第3区 Saitama-ken dai-sanku or simply 埼玉3区 Saitama 3-ku) is a constituency of the House of Representatives in the Diet of Japan. It is located in Southeastern Saitama and consists of the cities of Sōka and Koshigaya. As of 2012, 460,884 eligible voters were registered in the district.

Before the electoral reform of 1994, Sōka was part of the 1st district where three Representatives had been elected by single non-transferable vote, and Koshigaya part of Saitama 4th district (four Representatives).

Between 1996 and 2009, the district had been closely contested between former Sōka mayor Hiroshi Imai (now LDP, Koga faction) who was first elected as JNP candidate from the old 1st district in 1993, and Ex-Socialist Ritsuo Hosokawa (now DPJ, Kan group) who is originally from Kōchi Prefecture but had represented the old 4th district for the JSP since 1990. After his 2009 defeat Imai retired from politics. Hosokawa went on to serve in the DPJ-led cabinets as vice minister and minister. But in the landslide Democratic defeat in 2012, he lost the district to Liberal Democratic newcomer Hitoshi Kikawada and also failed to win a proportional seat.

List of representatives

Election results 

 
 
 
 
 
  

 
 
 
  
  

 
 
 
  
  

 
 
 
  
  

 
 
 
  

,

References 

Saitama Prefecture
Districts of the House of Representatives (Japan)